Jamal Harrison Bryant (born May 21, 1971) is an American minister and author.  He is the senior pastor of New Birth Missionary Baptist Church. He is a graduate of Morehouse College and of Duke University. He received his doctorate of ministry degree from the Graduate Theological Foundation.

In December 2018, Bryant transitioned from Empowerment Temple African Methodist Episcopal Church in Baltimore, Maryland to Atlanta, Georgia to pastor New Birth Missionary Baptist Church in DeKalb County.

Early life and education
Jamal Harrison Bryant was born on May 21, 1971, in Boston, Massachusetts to John Richard and Cecelia Bryant (née Williams). He has a younger sister. He was raised in Baltimore, Maryland where, as a child, he attended his father's church Bethel A.M.E. Church. He preached his first sermon when he was 18 years old at Bethel titled "No Pain, No Gain."

Bryant attended Morehouse College where he earned an undergraduate degree in political science and international studies. He obtained a master's of divinity degree from Duke University in Durham, North Carolina. He received a doctorate of ministry degree from the Graduate Theological Foundation. Bryant is a member of Kappa Alpha Psi fraternity.

AME review after divorce
Officials of the A.M.E. denomination intended, as of February 2008, to enter into discussions regarding Bryant's leadership, following mutual filings for divorce by Bryant, his spouse, Hampton alumna and future Real Housewives of Potomac star Gizelle Bryant.  However, they said that Bryant did not face a disciplinary trial because no one came forward with a complaint against him.  Church officials said that Bryant "was never charged through the church system with anything." In 2019, the two renewed their relationship and began dating again.

References

External links

1971 births
Living people
African Methodist Episcopal Church
American evangelists
American motivational speakers
American Pentecostals
American television personalities
Religious leaders from Baltimore
Duke University alumni